
Year 230 BC was a year of the pre-Julian Roman calendar. At the time it was known as the Year of the Consulship of Barbula and Pera (or, less frequently, year 524 Ab urbe condita). The denomination 230 BC for this year has been used since the early medieval period, when the Anno Domini calendar era became the prevalent method in Europe for naming years.

Events 
 By place 
 Asia Minor 
 The city of Pergamum is attacked by the Galatians (Celts who have settled in central Anatolia) because the leader of Pergamum, Attalus I Soter, has refused to pay them the customary tribute. Attalus crushes his enemy in a battle outside the walls of his city and to mark the success he takes the title of king and the name Soter.

 Greece 
 King Agron of Illyria dies. Pinnes, the son of Agron and Agron's first wife Triteuta, officially succeeds his father as king, but the kingdom is effectively ruled by Agron's second wife, Queen Teuta (Tefta), who expels the Greeks from the Illyrian coast and then launches Illyrian pirate ships into the Ionian Sea, preying on Roman shipping. She continues her husband's policy of attacking cities on the west coast of Greece and practising large-scale piracy in the Adriatic and Ionian Seas.

 Roman Republic 
 With Roman merchants being killed by the Illyrian pirates, envoys are sent by Rome to Illyria. After the Roman ambassador lucius Coruncanius and the Issaean ambassador Cleemporus are murdered at sea by Illyrian soldiers after causing offence to Queen Teuta, Roman forces occupy the island of Corcyra with the aim of humbling Teuta.

 Egypt 
 The Temple of Horus is built by King Ptolemy III.

 China 
 The state of Han is conquered by the state of Qin.

 India 
 King Kubera rules Bhattiprolu in Guntur, Andhra Pradesh.

Births 
 Titus Quinctius Flamininus, a Roman politician and general who will be instrumental in the Roman conquest of Greece (d. 174 BC)

Deaths 
 Adherbal, admiral of the Carthaginian fleet who has battled for domination of the Mediterranean Sea for Carthage in the First Punic War against Rome
 Agron of Illyria as aforementioned (vid. supra)
 Aristarchus of Samos, Greek astronomer and mathematician (b. c. 310 BC)

References